Salvatore Gionta (born 22 December 1930) is an Italian water polo player who competed in the 1952 Summer Olympics and in the 1960 Summer Olympics.

Biography and career
He was born in Formia. In 1952 he was part of the Italian team which won the bronze medal in the Olympic tournament. He played two matches. Eight years later he won the gold medal with the Italian team in the 1960 Olympic tournament. He played two matches and scored two goals.

See also
 Italy men's Olympic water polo team records and statistics
 List of Olympic champions in men's water polo
 List of Olympic medalists in water polo (men)

External links
 

1930 births
Living people
Italian male water polo players
People from Formia
Water polo players at the 1952 Summer Olympics
Water polo players at the 1960 Summer Olympics
Olympic gold medalists for Italy in water polo
Olympic bronze medalists for Italy in water polo
Medalists at the 1960 Summer Olympics
Medalists at the 1952 Summer Olympics
Sportspeople from the Province of Latina